Kase2 (December 12, 1958 – August 14, 2011), also known as King Kase2 and Case2; born Jeff Brown, was a graffiti writer and a significant contributor to the hip-hop movement.

Biography 
Jeff Brown was born in New York City. He painted his first handball court in 1973 and by 1976 had painted over fifty major pieces on subway trains in New York City. In the 1980s he popularized his "computer rock" style, a form of wildstyle where letters are broken into boxes and scrambled. He was a member of TFP Crew (The Fantastic Partners).

The self-proclaimed King of Style, Kase was admired by other graffiti writers as having a natural flair for his art, his train pieces being creative and stylish. He was included in the original hip-hop documentary Style Wars, which won the Grand Prize for Documentaries at the 1983 Sundance Film Festival.

Kase lost his right arm in a subway accident when he was just ten years old. Kase explained what happened to himself in 'Style Wars': "It wasn't no severely bad accident, just that I got burnt by wires, that's all... electrical wires, and then they rushed me to the hospital and they just had to amputate... 'Cause my tissues and muscles was burnt bad."

Kase died on August 14, 2011, at Lincoln Medical and Mental Health Center in South Bronx from lung adenocarcinoma.

References

1958 births
2011 deaths
American graffiti artists